Harnochina is a monotypic snout moth genus described by Harrison Gray Dyar Jr. in 1914. Its single species, Harnochina rectilinea, is found in Panama.

References

Anerastiini
Monotypic moth genera
Moths of Central America
Pyralidae genera